The following are the Pulitzer Prizes for 1950.

Journalism awards

Public Service:
 The Chicago Daily News and the St. Louis Post-Dispatch, for the work of George Thiem and Roy J. Harris, respectively, in exposing the presence of 37 Illinois newspapermen on an Illinois State payroll.
Local Reporting:
 Meyer Berger of The New York Times, for his 4,000-word story on the mass killings by Howard Unruh in Camden, New Jersey.
National Reporting:
 Edwin O. Guthman of The Seattle Times, for his series on the clearing of Communist charges of Professor Melvin Rader, who had been accused of attending a secret Communist school.
International Reporting:
 Edmund Stevens of The Christian Science Monitor, for his series of 43 articles written over a three-year residence in Moscow entitled, "This Is Russia Uncensored".
Editorial Writing:
 Carl M. Saunders of the Jackson Citizen Patriot, for distinguished editorial writing during the year.
Editorial Cartooning:
 James T. Berryman of the Washington Evening Star, for "All Set for a Super-Secret Session in Washington".
Photography:
 Bill Crouch of The Oakland Tribune, for his picture, "Near Collision at Air Show".

Letters, Drama and Music Awards

Fiction:
 The Way West by A. B. Guthrie, Jr. (Sloane).
Drama:
South Pacific by Richard Rodgers, Oscar Hammerstein II, and Joshua Logan (Random).
History:
 Art and Life in America by Oliver Waterman Larkin (Rinehart).
Biography or Autobiography:
 John Quincy Adams and the Foundations of American Foreign Policy by Samuel Flagg Bemis (Knopf).
Poetry:
 Annie Allen by Gwendolyn Brooks (Harper).
Music;
 Music in The Consul by Gian-Carlo Menotti (G. Schirmer), produced at the Ethel Barrymore Theatre, New York.

References

External links
Pulitzer Prizes for 1950

Pulitzer Prizes by year
Pulitzer Prize
Pulitzer Prize